Chase Jonathan d'Arnaud (born January 21, 1987), is an American former professional baseball utility player. He previously played in Major League Baseball (MLB) for the Pittsburgh Pirates, Philadelphia Phillies, Atlanta Braves, Boston Red Sox, San Diego Padres, and San Francisco Giants.

High school and college
D'Arnaud graduated from Los Alamitos High School in 2005. He was drafted by the Los Angeles Dodgers in the 44th Round of the 2005 MLB Draft, but he chose to attend Pepperdine University. He played for the Anchorage Glacier Pilots of the Alaska Baseball League in summer 2006 and he played with the Orleans Cardinals in the Cape Cod Baseball League during summer 2007. He was drafted by the Pittsburgh Pirates in the 4th Round of the 2008 MLB Draft.

Professional baseball career

Pittsburgh Pirates

D'Arnaud made his professional baseball debut in 2008, playing for the State College Spikes. In 2009, he played for the West Virginia Power and the Lynchburg Hillcats. In 2010, he played for the Altoona Curve.

In 2011, d'Arnaud was playing for the Indianapolis Indians when he was called up to the majors by the Pittsburgh Pirates for the first time on June 24. In his major league debut, he recorded his first major league hit, a triple, off Boston Red Sox pitcher Jon Lester. D'Arnaud appeared in 48 games for the Pirates in 2011, batting .217, with six runs batted in and 12 stolen bases.

In 2012, d'Arnaud played 98 games for Indianapolis, batting .252 with 34 stolen bases. He was recalled by the Pirates on September 10, 2012. He played eight games for the Pirates in 2012, scoring a pair of runs and getting a stolen base.

On March 20, 2013, the Pirates placed d'Arnaud on the 60-day disabled list after surgery to repair a partially torn ligament in his left thumb. D'Arnaud started a rehab assignment with the Bradenton Marauders on May 16. On May 18, his rehab assignment was transferred to the Altoona Curve, and then to the Indianapolis Indians on May 25.  He was activated from the disabled list and optioned to Indianapolis on May 31, where he played the rest of the season.

D'Arnaud was designated for assignment on February 24, 2014 when Brent Morel was claimed on waivers from the Toronto Blue Jays. He spent the season with Indianapolis, and his contract was selected by the Pirates on September 2 after the rosters expanded. He appeared in eight games for the Pirates in 2014, and was used as a pinch runner and defensive replacement.

On November 3, he was outrighted to Indianapolis and elected free agency.

Philadelphia Phillies
On November 13, 2014 d'Arnaud signed a minor league deal with the Philadelphia Phillies. He spent the 2015 minor league season with the Triple-A Lehigh Valley IronPigs. His contract was selected by the Phillies from Lehigh Valley on September 14, 2015.

Atlanta Braves
On November 24, 2015, d'Arnaud signed a minor league contract with the Atlanta Braves.

D'Arnaud was designated for assignment on April 25, 2017.

Boston Red Sox
He was claimed by the Boston Red Sox on April 27. D'Arnaud was designated for assignment on May 18, 2017.

San Diego Padres
On May 21, 2017, he was claimed by the San Diego Padres.

San Francisco Giants
He signed a minor league contract with the San Francisco Giants in January 2018. His contract was selected from the Sacramento River Cats on July 7.

Texas Rangers
On December 17, 2018, d'Arnaud signed a minor league contract with the Texas Rangers. He was assigned to the Triple-A Nashville Sounds to open the 2019 season. He was released on June 18.

Kansas City Royals
On June 21, 2019, d’Arnaud signed a minor league deal with the Kansas City Royals. He became a free agent following the 2019 season.

On February 17, 2020, d’Arnaud announced his retirement from baseball via Instagram.

However, the retirement was short-lived as he made himself available to play for the Philippines in the 2021 World Baseball Classic qualifiers to be held in Tucson, Arizona from March 20 to 25, 2020. D'Arnaud is Filipino from his mother's, Marita, side of the family.

Personal
D'Arnaud is the son of Lance and Marita d’Arnaud. His younger brother Travis is the catcher for the Atlanta Braves.

D'Arnaud and his wife, Kaitlyn, married in 2016. They have one son together.

D'Arnaud is also known for his musical pursuits, and is the lead singer of the Chase d'Arnaud Band. In 2016, they performed at Bonnaroo Music Festival.

References

External links

 Pepperdine Waves bio
 

1987 births
Living people
Baseball players from Torrance, California
Altoona Curve players
Atlanta Braves players
Boston Red Sox players
Bradenton Marauders players
El Paso Chihuahuas players
Gwinnett Braves players
Indianapolis Indians players
Lehigh Valley IronPigs players
Lynchburg Hillcats players
Major League Baseball infielders
Nashville Sounds players
Omaha Storm Chasers players
Orleans Firebirds players
Pepperdine Waves baseball players
Philadelphia Phillies players
Pittsburgh Pirates players
Sacramento River Cats players
San Diego Padres players
San Francisco Giants players
Scottsdale Scorpions players
State College Spikes players
Toros del Este players
West Virginia Power players
American expatriate baseball players in the Dominican Republic
American baseball players of Filipino descent
Anchorage Glacier Pilots players